Jorge Roque Vargas (born April 29, 1950, in Ponce, Puerto Rico) is a former professional baseball player who was an outfielder for 65 career games in Major League Baseball for the St. Louis Cardinals from  to  and the Montreal Expos in .

Roque joined the Cardinals' organization in 1967. He was called to the majors for the first time in September 1970 after his selection as an All-Star by the Class A California League, where he led the circuit in runs scored (101) and hits (165) in 137 games played. In 1971, after another strong showing, this time in the Double-A Texas League, Roque received another September audition. In his first game back with the Cardinals, he had three hits in four at bats September 26 against the Expos. On November 6, the Cardinals traded Roque to Montreal to reacquire their former All-Star catcher of the 1960s, Tim McCarver.

Despite having hit a grand slam as Montreal's starting center fielder on Opening Day , and receiving a lengthy trial during the season's first month, his desperate struggles as a batsman continued. Three consecutive two-hit games from April 17–19 lifted his batting mark to .222, but he would collect only one more safety through May 6, when he was supplanted by Ron Woods as the club's right-handed-hitting center fielder. Roque was sent to Triple-A after May 15. He hit .148 in 61 at bats during his Expo tenure. As a major leaguer, he collected only 19 career hits and ten bases on balls in 154 plate appearances; he batted .137 with four doubles, one triple, and two home runs.

His professional career continued in the Triple-A Mexican League from 1974 to 1979. He was selected by the New York Mets from Pericos de Puebla in the Rule 5 Draft on December 2, 1974.

References

External links

1950 births
Living people
Arkansas Travelers players
Azules de Coatzacoalcos players
Cafeteros de Córdoba players
Cedar Rapids Cardinals players
Gulf Coast Cardinals players
Major League Baseball outfielders
Major League Baseball players from Puerto Rico
Modesto Reds players
Montreal Expos players
Peninsula Whips players
Pericos de Puebla players
Puerto Rican expatriate baseball players in Canada
Puerto Rican expatriate baseball players in Mexico
Sportspeople from Ponce, Puerto Rico
St. Louis Cardinals players
Tecolotes de Nuevo Laredo players
Tulsa Oilers (baseball) players